DD Podhigai is Doordarshan's Tamil language channel. It is broadcast both terrestrially and via satellite.

History
Doordarshan Kendra Chennai's (சென்னை தொலைக்காட்சி நிலையம்) Regional satellite Network, DD-5, was launched on 15 April 1993. This service is viewed in India and some parts of the world. DD-5 took a new identity in Tamil and was renamed DD Podhigai on 15 January 2000. Doordarshan Kendra, Chennai was inaugurated on 15 August 1975.

History of channel name
The name Podhigai was suggested by the viewers themselves. It is named after Podhigai Hills situated in Tirunelveli district. This hill range is part of Western Ghats of Southern India. This hill range is famous for its association with Sage Agastya. Legend has it that Agastya created Tamil in this hill. Thamirabarani River originates here.

Programmes
The channel offers a variety of programmes with films, infotainment programmes, news and current affairs being most prominent. Serial programming was discontinued in 2015. It is the only regional language satellite channel with terrestrial transmission. Terrestrial transmission is limited to major cities in Tamil Nadu.

See also 
 DD Chennai
 List of programs broadcast by DD National
 All India Radio
 Ministry of Information and Broadcasting
 DD Direct Plus
 List of South Asian television channels by country
 Media in Chennai

References

External links 
 Doordarshan Official Internet site
 Doordarshan news site
 An article at PFC

Television stations in Chennai
Foreign television channels broadcasting in the United Kingdom
Television channels and stations established in 1993
Indian direct broadcast satellite services
Doordarshan
1993 establishments in Tamil Nadu